was a Japanese politician. He was born in Yamagata Prefecture. He was governor of Nagano Prefecture (1931-1933) and mayor of Nagano, Nagano (October 1941-April 1942). He was a member of the Government-General of Taiwan. He died in office.

References

Bibliography
Successive governor編纂会編『新編Japanのsuccessive governor』successive governor編纂会、1991.
Ikuhiko Hata編『Comprehensive Encyclopedia of the Japanese Bureaucracy：1868 - 2000』University of Tokyo Press、2001.
Nagano Prefecture姓氏歴史人物大辞典編纂委員会編著『Nagano Prefecture姓氏歴史人物大辞典』角川Japan姓氏歴史人物大辞典30、角川書店、1996.

1880 births
1942 deaths
People from Yamagata Prefecture
Governors of Nagano
Japanese Home Ministry government officials
Japanese Police Bureau government officials
Members of the Government-General of Taiwan
University of Tokyo alumni